

Appointed governors
Ryo Shioya 1872-1873
Tokisuke Miyagi 1873-1878
Matsudaira Masanao 1878-1891
Mamoru Funakoshi 1891-1894
Minoru Katsumata 1894-1897
Sukeo Kabayama 1897-1898
Tokito Konkyo 1898
Ōura Kanetake 1898
Kiyoshi Shin 1898-1900
Chikaaki Takasaki 1900
Nomura Masaaki 1900
Motohiro Onoda 1900-1902
Tadashi Munakata 1902-1903
Terumi Tanabe 1903-1905
Kamei Ezaburo 1905-1908
Terada Yushi 1908-1913
Mori Masataka 1913-1914
Magoichi Tahara 1914-1915
Tsunenosuke Hamada 1915-1919
Mori Masataka (2nd time) 1919-1921
Yūichirō Chikaraishi 1921-1924
Manbei Ueda 1924-1926
Katorataro Ushizu 1926-1929
Michio Yuzawa 1929-1931
Minabe Choji 1931-1933
Asaji Akagi 1933-1934
Kiyoshi Nakarai 1934-1935
Jiro Ino 1935-1936
Yoshio Kikuyama 1936-1939
Kyuichiro Totsuka 1939
Ryosaku Shimizu 1939-1940
Nobuo Hayashin 1940-1942
Otomaru Kato 1942-1943
Nobuya Uchida 1943-1944
Tsurukichi Maruyama 1944-1945
Motome Ikezumi 1945
Saburo Chiba 1945-1947

Elected governors
Jiro Kazuo Watanabe 1947
Saburo Chiba (2nd time) 1947-1949
Kazuji Sasaki 1949-1952
Otogoro Miyagi 1952-1956
Yasushi Onuma 1956-1959
Yoshio Miura 1959-1965
Shintaro Takahashi 1965-1969
Soichiro Yamamoto 1969-1989
Shuntara Honma 1989-1993
Shirō Asano (politician) 1993-2005
Yoshihiro Murai 2005–present

References 

 
Miyagi Prefecture